Stephen William Kaye (born 1951) is a judge of the Supreme Court of Victoria. He was appointed to the bench on 16 December 2003, serving as a judge of the Trial Division until his appointment the Court of Appeal in 2015. On 1 February 2022 the Attorney General of the Victorian Government announced the end of his term from the Court of Appeal.

Kaye is the son of William Kaye, who was also a Supreme Court judge. His paternal grandparents were Jewish immigrants from Ukraine. Like his father, Kaye attended Scotch College, where he was dux in 1968. He then studied law at Monash University.

References

Judges of the Supreme Court of Victoria
Monash University alumni
Living people
1951 births
People educated at Scotch College, Melbourne
Australian people of Ukrainian-Jewish descent
Monash Law School alumni